Serhiy Mykolayovych Zhuravlyov (born 24 April 1959 in Ukrainian SSR, Soviet Union) is a retired professional Soviet football defender who played for Dynamo Kyiv in the Soviet Top League.

In 1979 Zhuravlyov played couple of games for Ukraine at the Spartakiad of the Peoples of the USSR.

Honours
 Soviet Top League champion: 1980, 1981.
 Soviet Top League runner-up: 1982.
 Soviet Top League bronze: 1979.
 Soviet Cup winner: 1982

References

FC Dynamo Kyiv players
FC Shakhtar Donetsk players
FC Zorya Luhansk players
1959 births
Living people
People from Brianka
Soviet footballers
FC Zimbru Chișinău players
FC Metalist Kharkiv players
FC Podillya Khmelnytskyi players
Association football defenders
Sportspeople from Luhansk Oblast